Simon Luttrell, 1st Earl of Carhampton (1713 – 14 January 1787), was an Anglo-Irish politician who sat in the House of Commons from 1754 to 1780.

Biography
He was the second son of Henry Luttrell, of Luttrellstown (whose family had held Luttrellstown since the land there had been granted to Sir Geoffrey de Luterel in about 1210 by King John of England) and his wife Elizabeth Jones. His father had been a noted commander in the Jacobite Irish Army between 1689 and 1691. He later received a pardon from the Williamite authorities and was accused by his former Jacobite comrades of having betrayed them. He was murdered when his sedan chair was attacked in Dublin in 1717.

Simon Luttrell served as a Member of Parliament in the House of Commons of Great Britain for four constituencies: Mitchell (1755–1761), Wigan (1761–1768), Weobley (1768–1774) and Stockbridge (1774–1780).

On 13 October 1768, he was created Baron Irnham of Luttrellstown in the Peerage of Ireland. As his title was an Irish peerage, he was able to keep his seat in the British House of Commons. He was elevated to the title of Viscount Carhampton on 9 January 1781 and was made Earl of Carhampton on 23 June 1785. He lived at Four Oaks Hall, Four Oaks, Sutton Coldfield, from 1751 to 1766.

On 22 January 1735, he married Judith Maria Lawes, daughter of Sir Nicholas Lawes, Governor of Jamaica and Elizabeth Cotton (née Lawley), by whom he had eight children:
 Henry Lawes Luttrell, 2nd Earl of Carhampton (1743–1821)
 John Luttrell-Olmius, 3rd Earl of Carhampton (c. 1745 – 1829), married the Honorable Elizabeth Olmius and in 1787 by Royal Licence the additional surname of 'Olmius' out of respect after his father-in-law died.
 Temple Simon Luttrell (c. 1738 – 1803)
 James Luttrell (c. 1751 – 1788), naval officer, died of consumption.
 Thomas Luttrell (died 1766)
 Anne Luttrell (c. 1752 – 1808), married first in 1765 Christopher Horton, married second in 1771 to Prince Henry, Duke of Cumberland and Strathearn, brother of King George III of the United Kingdom, without consent, resulting in the Royal Marriages Act 1772.
 Elizabeth Luttrell (1744-1799)
 Lucy Luttrell

His rakish behaviour earned him the nickname "King of Hell", "Hell" being a district of Dublin notorious for its brothels. He is reputed to have started the courtesan Mary Nesbitt in her career by seducing her.

References

External links
 The Diaboliad, a poem dedicated to the worst man in His Majesty's dominions

|-

|-

1713 births
1787 deaths
18th-century Anglo-Irish people
British MPs 1754–1761
British MPs 1761–1768
Irnham, Simon Luttrell, 1st Baron
Irnham, Simon Luttrell, 1st Baron
Earls in the Peerage of Ireland
Irnham, Simon Luttrell, 1st Baron
Members of the Parliament of Great Britain for Mitchell
Politics of the Metropolitan Borough of Wigan
Carhampton
Conversationalists